Machli Gaon also known as Makhdumpur is a village situated in Ghanghata tehsil. Nearest market is Duswa Bazaar, Sanichara, Govind Ganj and the nearest river is Sarayu river.

The important thing for this village is that it is connected through ROAD constructed under PMGSY.  Distance from Dhanghata tehsil is 11 kilometers and Sarayu river is 5 kilometers.

The major occupation of the people in the village is agriculture.

Demography

According to the 2011 India census, Machli Gaon had 315 households with the population of 1,885, where Males constituted 990 of the population, and females 895.total Literacy rate is 71.41%.

Transport

Machli gaon village is well connected to State Highway 72. People transport through Bullock Cart, Rikshaw, Auto Rikshaw, Tractor.

Education

There is one primary school in this village.

Villages in Sant Kabir Nagar district